Orostachys is a genus of the succulent family Crassulaceae (stonecrop family) that contains about 15 species. It is a biennial herb growing in China, Japan, Kazakhstan, Korea, Mongolia, Russia. Eight species occur in China.

Description
Orostachys are the most morphologically distinct member of subfamily Sempervivoideae. Orostachys species are mostly biennial herbaceous plants that are more or less succulent. Leaves are linear to ovate, often with dull purple dots. The arrangement is alternate, forming crowded cauline rosettes. Especially the thick-fleshed foliage stores water. The leaf ends have a cartilaginous to spiny, white tip. Leaf margins are usually smooth. Stipules are absent. The roots are fibrous and there is no rhizome.

In the first year, the leaves stand together in solitary, basal, dense rosettes. In the second year, a solitary, leafy stem, 5 to 60 cm in length, arises from the center of the rosette and forms flowers. The terminal inflorescences, usually branched and composed of individual spicate inflorescences, are relatively large and narrowly pyramidal to cylindrical, containing many flowers and foliage-like bracts. The flowers, which are at most very short-stemmed, are hermaphroditic and pentamerous. The free sepals are usually shorter than the petals. The five predominantly yellow, rarely white, yellow-green, or pinkish to reddish petals are almost free. There are two circles with five stamens. The yellowish nectary scales are relatively small. The erect carpels are free and contain many ovules. The styles are narrow.

The many-seeded follicles possess a beak-like end. The seeds are small.

Taxonomy
Within family Crassulaceae, Orostachys is placed in tribe Telephieae of subfamily Sempervivoideae. The genus has. at times, included Meterostachys. Molecular phylogenetics shows that the genus is not monophyletic, but polyphyletic relative to paraphyletic Hylotelephium. Its circumscription, therefore, is unstable and subject to revision.

Subdivision
The genus Orostachys has been divided into series (or sections), including:
 Orostachys series Appendiculatae
 Orostachys series Eappendiculatae

Other authors have created two different sections:
 Orostachys section Orostachys
 Orostachys section Schoenlandia

Some species were transferred from Sinocrassula into Orostachys, as section Schoenlandia, also treated as a subgenus or section, or a separate genus Kungia, e.g. O. schoenlandii (Kungia schoenlandii). Orostachys section Orostachys, in turn has been treated as two subsections, differing by either flat or fleshy leaf shape, and the presence or absence of appendages on the leaves, which include spines or cartilaginous protrusions:
 Orostachys subsection Orostachys
 Orostachys subsection Appendiculatae

On the basis of molecular data, it has been proposed that Orostachys subsection Appendiculatae be considered a separate genus.

Species
The genus includes about 12–17 accepted species, including:

 Orostachys aggregata (Makino) H. Hara
  Orostachys boehmeri V.N. Boriss. – also called O. furusei, endemic plant from Japan
Orostachys cartilaginea (H. Lév.) A. Berger
 Orostachys chanetii  A. Berger
 Orostachys fimbriata (Turcz.) A.Berger
 Orostachys genkaiensis Ohwi
 Orostachys iwarenge  Hara – Chinese Dunce Cap
 Orostachys malacophylla (Pall.) Fisch. – type species
 Orostachys minuta (Kom.) A. Berger
 Orostachys paradoxa (Khokhr. & Vorosch.) Czerep.
 Orostachys sikokiana (Makino) Ohwi
 Orostachys spinosa (L.) Sweet
 Orostachys thyrsiflora Fisch.

References

Bibliography

  (full text at ResearchGate)
 
 
 
 
 , in Flora of China online vol. 8

Crassulaceae
Crassulaceae genera